The 2017–18 Grambling State Tigers men's basketball team represented Grambling State University during the 2017–18 NCAA Division I men's basketball season. The Tigers, led by first-year head coach Donte Jackson, played their home games at the Fredrick C. Hobdy Assembly Center in Grambling, Louisiana as members of the Southwestern Athletic Conference.

With a win over Alabama State on March 3, 2018, Grambling State clinched the outright SWAC regular season championship, the school's first since 1989. They finished the season 17–14, 13–5 in SWAC play. However, the Tigers were ineligible for postseason play due to APR violations.

Previous season
The Tigers finished the 2016–17 season 16–17, 10–8 in SWAC play to finish in a four-way tie for third place. As the 5-seed in the SWAC tournament they defeated Prairie View A&M before losing in the semifinals to Texas Southern.

On March 22, 2017, it was announced that head coach Shawn Walker's contract would not be renewed. He finished at Grambling State with a three-year record of 25–68. On May 12, Grambling State hired Donte Jackson from Stillman of the NAIA as new head coach.

Roster

Schedule and results

|-
!colspan=9 style=| Non-conference regular season

|-
!colspan=9 style=| SWAC regular season

References

Grambling State Tigers men's basketball seasons
Grambling State
Gramb
Gramb